Mark James Kermode (born 2 July 1963) is an English film critic, musician, radio presenter, television presenter and podcaster. He is the chief film critic for The Observer, contributes to the magazine Sight & Sound, presents a weekly Scala Radio film music show and the BBC Four documentary series Mark Kermode's Secrets of Cinema, and is a co-presenter of the film-review podcast Kermode & Mayo's Take alongside long-time collaborator Simon Mayo.

Kermode previously co-presented the BBC Radio 5 Live show Kermode and Mayo's Film Review, and previously co-presented the BBC Two arts programme The Culture Show. He is a member of the British Academy of Film and Television Arts and a founding member of the skiffle band the Dodge Brothers, for which he plays double bass.

Early life
Kermode was born in Barnet, Hertfordshire. He was educated at The Haberdashers' Aske's Boys' School, a private boys' school in Elstree, Hertfordshire, the same year as actor Jason Isaacs and former Brexit Party Member of the European Parliament, Lance Forman.

He was raised as a Methodist, and later became a member of the Church of England. His parents divorced when he was in his early 20s and he subsequently changed his surname to his mother's maiden name by deed poll.  He earned his PhD in English at the University of Manchester in 1991, writing a thesis on horror fiction.

Film criticism 

Kermode began his film career as a print journalist, writing for Manchester's City Life, and then Time Out and NME in London. He has written for The Independent, Vox, Empire, Flicks, Fangoria and Neon.

Kermode began working as a film reviewer for BBC Radio 1 in 1993, on a regular Thursday night slot called Cult Film Corner on Mark Radcliffe's Graveyard Shift session. He later moved to Simon Mayo's BBC Radio 1 morning show. He hosted a movie review show with Mary Anne Hobbs on Radio 1 on Tuesday nights called Cling Film. Between February 1992 and October 1993, he was the resident film reviewer on BBC Radio 5's Morning Edition with Danny Baker.

From 2001 until 2022, Kermode reviewed and debated new film releases with Mayo on the BBC Radio 5 Live show Kermode and Mayo's Film Review.  The programme won Gold in the Speech Award category at the 2009 Sony Radio Academy Awards on 11 May 2009.  On 11 March 2022, it was announced by Simon Mayo, at the start of the Kermode and Mayo Film Review, that the last Kermode and Mayo's Film Review will be broadcast on 1 April 2022.

Kermode and Mayo have announced their new non-BBC podcast "Kermode & Mayo's Take" is launching in May 2022 and they now have an official website, https://www.kermodeandmayo.com/

He has worked on film-related documentaries including The Fear of God; 25 Years of The Exorcist, Hell on Earth: The Desecration and Resurrection of Ken Russell's The Devils, Alien: Evolution, On the Edge of Blade Runner, and The Cult of The Wicker Man.

Until September 2005, Kermode reviewed films each week for the New Statesman. Since 2009 Kermode has written "Mark Kermode's DVD round-up" for The Observer, a weekly review of the latest releases.  He sometimes writes for the British Film Institute's Sight and Sound magazine. Kermode is a film critic and presenter for Film4 and Channel 4, presenting the weekly Extreme Cinema strand. He writes and presents documentaries for Channel 4, and appears on The Film Review for BBC News at Five. For BBC Two's The Culture Show, Kermode hosted an annual "Kermode Awards" episode which presented statuettes to actors and directors not nominated for Academy Awards that year.

In 2002, Kermode was critical of the British Board of Film Classification (BBFC), the censor for film in the UK, for its cuts to the 1972 film The Last House on the Left.  In 2008, the BBFC allowed the film to be re-released uncut.  He has stated that the BBFC do a good job in an impossible situation and expressed his approval of their decisions.

In a 2012 Sight & Sound poll of cinema's greatest films, Kermode indicated his ten favourites, a list later published in order of preference in his book Hatchet Job, as The Exorcist, A Matter of Life and Death, The Devils, It's a Wonderful Life, Don't Look Now, Pan's Labyrinth, Mary Poppins, Brazil, Eyes Without a Face and The Seventh Seal.

In September 2013, Kermode became the chief film critic for The Observer.

In 2018, he began to present his own documentary series Mark Kermode's Secrets of Cinema on BBC Four. A second series followed, as well as Disaster Movie, Christmas, and Oscar Winners specials. 
  
In 2019 Kermode presented a movie soundtrack themed show on classical radio station Scala Radio.

Kermode produces an annual "best-of-the-year" movie list, thereby providing an overview of his critical preferences. His top choices were:

Other writing
In February 2010, Random House released his autobiography, It's Only a Movie, which he describes as being "inspired by real events". Its publication was accompanied by a UK tour. In September 2011 he released a follow-up book entitled The Good, the Bad and the Multiplex, in which he puts forth his opinion on the good and bad of modern films, and vehemently criticizes the modern multiplex experience and the 3D film craze that had grown in the years immediately preceding the book's publication. In 2013 Picador published "Hatchet Job: Love Movies, Hate Critics" in which he examines the need for professional "traditional" film critics in a culture of ever increasing online bloggers and amateur critics.

In 2017, he collaborated with his idol William Friedkin on the feature documentary The Devil and Father Amorth, as a writer. The film had its first showing at the Venice Film Festival on 31 August 2017.

Other work
Kermode was a regular presenter on BBC Two's The Culture Show and appeared regularly on Newsnight Review.  It was during a 2006 interview with Kermode for The Culture Show in Los Angeles that Werner Herzog was shot with an air rifle. Herzog appeared unflustered, later stating "It was not a significant bullet. I am not afraid".

Kermode co-hosted an early 1990s afternoon magazine show on BBC Radio 5 called A Game of Two Halves alongside former Blue Peter presenter Caron Keating.

Kermode appeared in a cameo role as himself in the revival of the BBC's Absolutely Fabulous on 1 January 2012.

In April 2008, Kermode started a twice-weekly video blog hosted on the BBC website, in which he discussed films and recounts anecdotes. He retired the podcast for its 10th anniversary at the close of 2018, with special episodes on his most and least favourite movies of the previous decade.

Kermode has recorded DVD audio commentaries for Tommy, The Devils, The Ninth Configuration, The Wicker Man and (with Peter O'Toole) Becket. He appears in the DVD extras of Lost in La Mancha, interviewing Terry Gilliam and Pan's Labyrinth where he interviews Guillermo del Toro about the film, which he has called a masterpiece. Kermode has written books, published by the BFI in its Modern Classics series, on The Exorcist and The Shawshank Redemption and his documentary for Channel 4, Shawshank: The Redeeming Feature, is on the film's 10th anniversary special edition DVD.

Kermode's family connections with the Isle of Man have led to him playing a role in Manx culture and the arts. This has seen him host various talks on the island including; An Evening with Mark Kermode at the Ballakermeen High School. He is involved with the annual Isle of Man Film Festival.

Kermode became patron of the Sir John Hurt Film Trust in November 2019. He is a visiting fellow at the University of Southampton.

Music

Kermode played double bass for a skiffle/rockabilly band called The Railtown Bottlers in the early 1990s. The Railtown Bottlers were the house band on the BBC show Danny Baker After All for a series, starting in 1993, where he performed with Madness lead singer, Suggs. In 2001 he formed The Dodge Brothers, playing double bass in the skiffle quartet.

Talking about his musical abilities he says “Somehow I got away with it. You can listen to it. It’s not terrible, it’s not brilliant, but it’s fine.” Kermode says that sheer persistence is the key to his musical success: “I’d rate enthusiasm and persistence over talent. And that’s been a guiding light, that you shouldn’t be put off by being unprepared or technically inept. I have managed to surround myself with other people who can play. And actually that’s the trick.”

Personal life
Kermode is married to Linda Ruth Williams, a professor who lectures on film at the University of Exeter. From October to November 2004, they jointly curated a History of the Horror Film season and exhibition at the National Film Theatre in London. Kermode and Williams have two children.

Kermode has been described as "a feminist, a near vegetarian (he eats fish), a churchgoer and a straight-arrow spouse who just happens to enjoy seeing people's heads explode across a cinema screen".

In the mid-1980s, Kermode was an "affiliate" of the Revolutionary Communist Group (RCG) and was involved in the Viraj Mendis Defence Campaign, against the deportation of one of the group's members to Sri Lanka. This developed into a high-profile national campaign involving people from left-wing groups such as the RCG, local residents of Manchester, and extending to church leaders and Labour Party Members of Parliament. Kermode describes himself in this period as "a red-flag waving bolshie bore with a subscription to Fight Racism Fight Imperialism and no sense of humour."

Awards and honours

Kermode is a patron of the charitable trust of the Phoenix Cinema in North London, which was his favourite cinema during his childhood in East Finchley. The tenth anniversary episode of Kermode and Mayo's Film Review was broadcast from the venue as part of its relaunch celebrations in 2010.

In 2013, Kermode was appointed an Island of Culture Patron by the Isle of Man Arts Council.

In 2016, Kermode was made an honorary Doctor of Letters at the University of Winchester.

In 2018, Kermode was appointed Honorary Professor in the Film Studies Department at the University of Exeter.

References

External links

 
 Mark Kermode profile at the University of Southampton
 Mark Kermode archive of selected articles in Critics/Authors Review and Articles at Rotten Tomatoes
 Screenshot (BBC Radio 4)
 Mark Kermode's Secrets of Cinema (BBC Four)
 Mark Kermode on Scala Radio (Scala Radio)
 Kermode and Mayo's Take Official Website

1963 births
21st-century British male musicians
21st-century double-bassists
Living people
Alumni of the University of Manchester
BBC Radio 5 Live presenters
British film historians
Converts to Anglicanism from Methodism
English Anglicans
English podcasters
English double-bassists
English feminists
English film critics
English male journalists
English radio presenters
English republicans
Feminist musicians
Male double-bassists
Male feminists
Musicians from Hertfordshire
People educated at Haberdashers' Boys' School
People from Brockenhurst
People from Chipping Barnet
Television personalities from Hertfordshire
The Observer people